The first series of The Real Housewives of Cheshire, a British reality television series, was broadcast on ITVBe. It aired from 12 January 2015 until 16 March 2015, and was primarily filmed in Cheshire and Greater Manchester, England. Its executive producers are Daran Little, Sean Murphy, Sarah Dillistone and David Granger.

The Real Housewives of Cheshire focuses on the lives of Ampika Pickston, Dawn Ward, Lauren Simon, Leanne Brown, Magali Gorré and Tanya Bardsley. It consisted of ten episodes.

Production and crew
The Real Housewives of Cheshire was announced on 22 September 2014. ITV had planned to profile the glamorous denizens of London's Knightsbridge in the series, but ITV bosses said "their homes weren’t quite big enough..", and so Cheshire was chosen. The show was announced by ITVBe as Britain's first Real Housewives instalment. "From "The Real Housewives" franchise comes the first British spin-off, featuring wealthy residents of Cheshire, including Dawn Ward, Lauren Simon, Leanne Brown, Magali Gorré, Tanya Bardsley and Ampika Pickston."

The series premiered with "Welcome to Cheshire" on 12 January 2015, while the tenth episode "Who's Coming To Dinner...?" served as the season finale, and was aired on 16 March 2015. Daran Little, Sean Murphy, Sarah Dillistone and David Granger are the series' executive producers; it is produced and distributed by Monkey Kingdom, one of Britain's leading independent production companies.

Cast and synopsis
Six housewives were featured during the first season of The Real Housewives of Cheshire. "The Real Housewives Of Cheshire documents the lives and dramas of a group of strong determined women each cast for their envious lifestyles, loveable families and compelling narratives. The Housewives love extremes, drink free flowing champagne, live in beautiful homes and wear the most fashionable and outrageous outfits, shoes and jewellery. Throughout the series the Housewives are put through a rollercoaster of emotions including love, hurt, hate, betrayal, good and poor fortune but are bound together by a shared humanity and group experiences.

Taglines
Ampika Pickston: "I'm always gonna get interest of the opposite sex, I'm like a snake and when I'm done with you, I'll discard you."
Dawn Ward: “I've got a wonderful life, I'm gobby, I'm full on. I'll always say what I think, you're not gonna change a leopard's spots.”
Lauren Simon: “I am of domestic order. I don't listen to anything anyone tells me, it's all about me.”
Leanne Brown: “I married a footballer, I live in a fairly big house. I'd say it's worked out well.”
Magali Gorre: “When you cross me, you better don't cross me. Don't mess with Magali.”
Tanya Bardsley: “I have my dream body, dream man, career. I've got it all.”

Episodes

References

Notes

The Real Housewives of Cheshire
2015 British television seasons